Pimentel is a city in the province Duarte and it is the 2nd largest in Duarte and the 25th largest city in the Dominican Republic.

Climate

References 

Populated places in Duarte Province
Municipalities of the Dominican Republic